Plinio Lauer Simões (July 8, 1915 - July 6, 1994) was a bishop in The Episcopal Church who served in his native country of Brazil.

References

Brazilian Anglican bishops
1915 births

1994 deaths